A horse-bus or horse-drawn omnibus was a large, enclosed, and sprung horse-drawn vehicle used for passenger transport before the introduction of motor vehicles. It was mainly used in the late 19th century in both the United States and Europe, and was one of the most common means of transportation in cities. In a typical arrangement, two wooden benches along the sides of the passenger cabin held several sitting passengers facing each other. The driver sat on a separate, front-facing bench, typically in an elevated position outside the passengers' enclosed cabin. In the main age of horse buses, many of them were double-decker buses. On the upper deck, which was uncovered, the longitudinal benches were arranged back to back.

Similar, if smaller, vehicles were often maintained at country houses (and by some hotels and railway companies) to convey servants and luggage to and from the railway station. Especially popular around 1870–1900, these vehicles were known as a 'private omnibuses' or 'station buses'; coachman-driven, they would usually accommodate four to six passengers inside, with room for luggage (and sometimes additional seating) on the roof.

A small open wagon with or without a top, but with an arrangement of the seats similar to horse-drawn omnibuses, was called a wagonette.

Etymology
Bus is a clipped form of the Latin word omnibus. A legend promoted by the French Transportations Museum website says the name is derived from a hatter's shop of the Omnes family in front of the first station opened in Nantes by Stanislas Baudry in 1823. "Omnes Omnibus" was a pun on the Latin-sounding name of that hatter Omnès: omnes (nominative plural) meaning "all" and omnibus (dative plural) meaning "for all" in Latin. Thence, the legend concludes, Nantes citizens gave the nickname of Omnibus to the vehicle.

Though it is undisputed that the term arose with Stanislas Baudry's company, there is no record of any Omnès hatter living in that street. In 1892, the son of Baudry's bookkeeper wrote in the Bulletin de la Société archéologique de Nantes that omnibus had a simpler origin. Baudry used to call his horsecars Dames blanches (White ladies), a name which, critics told him, made no sense. He then replied, with the Latin word: "Then, these are omnibus cars!" (cars for all). The name caught on immediately. Other stories about the name origin quickly spread out.

The term 'omnibus' carried over to motor vehicles. The 1914 book Motor Body-building in all its Branches, by Christopher William Terry, described an omnibus as having longitudinal seats in rows with either a rear door or side doors.

History
The first known public bus line (known as a "Carriage" at that time) were carrosses à cinq sols launched by Blaise Pascal in 1662 in Paris. It was quite popular until fares were increased and access to the service was restricted to high society members by regulation. Services ceased after 15 years.

In Britain, John Greenwood opened the first bus line in Britain in Manchester in 1824. His pioneering idea was to offer a service where, unlike with a stagecoach, no prior booking was necessary and the driver would pick up or set down passengers anywhere on request. The first omnibus was introduced in London in 1831. In 1833, legislation was passed to allow these long-bodied vehicles to ply the streets of the city, provided the drivers and conductors took out a license and wore a badge with a number on it.

The Paris omnibus was started in 1828 by a businessman named Stanislas Baudry, who had begun the first French omnibus line in Nantes in 1826, using two spring-suspended carriages, each for 16 passengers. Following success in Nantes, Baudry moved to Paris and founded the Enterprise des Omnibus on rue de Lancre, with workshops on the quai de Jemmapes. In 1827 he commissioned an English coach-maker, George Shillibeer, to design a vehicle that could be stable and carry a large number of passengers. Shillibeer's design worked. On 28 April 1828, the first Paris omnibus began service, running every fifteen minutes between La Madeleine and la Bastille. Before long, there were one hundred omnibuses in service, with eighteen different itineraries. A journey cost twenty-five centimes. The omnibuses circulated between seven in the morning and seven in the evening; each omnibus could carry between twelve and eighteen passengers.  The busiest line was that along the Grand Boulevards; it ran from eight in the morning until midnight. 

The Paris omnibus service was an immediate popular success, with more than two and a half million passengers in the first six months. There was no reliable way to collect money from the passengers, or the fare collectors kept much of the money for themselves;  In its first years the company was continually on the verge of bankruptcy, and in despair, Baudry committed suicide in February 1830. Baudry's partners reorganized the company and managed to keep it in business.

In September 1828, a competing company, les Dames-Blanches, had started running its own vehicles.  In 1829 and the following years, more companies with poetic names entered the business;  les Citadines, les Tricycles, les Orléanises, les Diligentes, les Écossaises, les Béarnaises, les Carolines, les Batignollaises, les Parisiennes, les Hirondelles, les Joséphines, les Excellentes, les Sylphides, les Constantines, les Dames-Françaises,  les Algériennes, les Dames-Réunies, and les Gazelles.  The omnibus had a profound effect on Parisian life, making it possible for Parisians to work and have a social life outside their own neighborhoods.

By 1845, 13 companies in Paris operated 20 or 23 omnibus lines. In 1855, Napoleon III had them combined into a single company, the Compagnie générale des omnibus, with a monopoly on Paris public transportation. Beginning in 1873, they were gradually replaced by tramways, and, beginning in 1906, by the omnibus automobile, or motor bus. The last horse-drawn Paris omnibus ran on 11 January 1913, from Saint-Sulpice to La Villette.

Buses have been used on the streets of London since 1829. George Shillibeer saw the success of the Paris omnibus in service and concluded that operating similar vehicles in London. His first London "Omnibus", using the same design and name as the Paris vehicle, took up service on 4 July 1829 on the route between Paddington (The Yorkshire Stingo) and "Bank" (Bank of England) via the "New Road" (now Marylebone Rd), Somers Town and City Road. Four services were provided in each direction daily. Shillibeer's success prompted many competitors to enter the market, and for a time buses were referred to as 'Shillibeers'. Shillibeer built another bus for the Quaker Newington Academy for Girls near London; this had a total of 25 seats, and entered history as the first school bus. On London omnibuses men were not permitted to use the upper deck until 1847.

In 1850 Thomas Tilling started horse bus services, and in 1855 the London General Omnibus Company or LGOC was founded to amalgamate and regulate the horse-drawn omnibus services then operating in London.

The public transport system of Berlin is the oldest one in Germany. In 1825 the first bus line from Brandenburger Tor to Charlottenburg was opened by Simon Kremser, running to a timetable. The first bus service inside the city operated from 1840 between Alexanderplatz and Potsdamer Bahnhof. It was run by Israel Moses Henoch, who had organized the cab service since 1815.
On 1 January 1847, the Concessionierte Berliner Omnibus Compagnie (Concessed Berlin Bus Company) started its first horse-bus line. The growing market experienced the launch of numerous additional companies, with 36 bus companies in Berlin by 1864.

From the end of the 1820s, the first horse-drawn omnibuses ran in the streets of New York City, facilitating the march uptown.

Horses pulling buses could only work for limited hours per day, had to be housed, groomed, fed and cared for every day, and produced large amounts of manure, which the omnibus company had to store and dispose of. Since a typical horse pulled a bus for four or five hours per day, covering about a dozen miles, many systems needed ten or more horses in stable for each bus.

With the advent of mass-produced steel (at around 1860), horse-buses were put on rails as the same horse could then move 3 to 10 times as many people. This was not only more efficient, but faster and produced, in an age of unpaved streets, a far superior ride.

These horse-cars on rails were converted to cable-drawn cars in larger cities, as still exist in San Francisco, the underground cable being drawn by stationary steam engines.

(Not to be overlooked was the establishment in both London and New York, of steam hauled urban railways, either underground or on elevated structures. These metropolitan railways are where the present term "Metro" began. These systems provided "rapid transit" on their routes).

At around 1890, electric propulsion became practical and replaced both the horse and the cable and the number of traction lines on rails expanded exponentially. (This was seen as a huge advance in urban transport and considered a wise investment at that time). These became known as streetcars, trams, or trolleys and still exist in many cities today, though often having been replaced by the less infrastructure intensive motorbus as driven by an internal combustion engine.

From the beginning of the twentieth century the remaining horse buses which had not been converted to rail began to be replaced by petrol-driven motor buses, or autobuses. The last recorded horse omnibus in London was a Tilling bus which last ran, between Peckham and Honor Oak Tavern, on 4 August 1914. The last Berlin horse omnibus ran on 25 August 1923. Some horse buses remain in use today for tourist sightseeing tours.

See also
 Bus or autobus, the later motorized multi-person vehicle
 Carriage
 Horse harness
 Stagecoach another type of horse-drawn passenger carriage for longer distances

Bibliography

References

External links

Peter Gould: Local Transport Histories > The Horse Bus 1662–1932

Animal-powered vehicles
Bus
Buses by type

it:Carrozza#Omnibus